Gheorghe Rosnovanu or Gheorghe Ruset Roznovanu (March 1, 1832–October 2, 1904) was a Moldavian-born Romanian soldier and politician.

A scion of the Moldavian boyar Rosetti family, his parents were hetman Alexandru Rosnovanu and his wife Ruxandra Callimachi. After finishing his schooling, he entered the Imperial Russian Army. Rosnovanu served there until 1857, when he entered the Moldavian Army as a second lieutenant. He advanced to major in 1858 and resigned as a colonel in 1863 from what was now the Romanian Army.

A conservative, he belonged to the constituent assembly of 1866, and was first elected to the Assembly of Deputies in 1867. Returned to active service in 1869, he was for a time prefect of Neamț County until 1876. He then practiced as a lawyer. Rosnovanu participated in the Romanian War of Independence. In 1879, he was elected to the Senate. He left the army for good in 1884. From May to December 1891, he was Assembly President. Rosnovanu died in Bucharest.

A high school in Roznov bears his name.

Notes

1832 births
1904 deaths
Rosetti family
Presidents of the Chamber of Deputies (Romania)
Members of the Chamber of Deputies (Romania)
Members of the Senate of Romania
Prefects of Romania
Conservative Party (Romania, 1880–1918) politicians
19th-century Romanian lawyers
Romanian military personnel of the Russo-Turkish War (1877–1878)
Romanian Land Forces officers
Imperial Russian Army personnel